Arthur Connell  (1717–1775) was an 18th-century Scottish sugar merchant and importer, who served as Lord Provost of Glasgow from 1772 to 1774. He was partner in the firm of Somervell Connell and Company.

Life
He was born in 1717 at the manse in East Kilbride, the son of Rev Matthew Connell.

In 1746 he commanded a company of the Glasgow Volunteers at the Battle of Falkirk.

He lived at Enoch Bank mansion house at the junction of West George Street and Renfield Street, near Glasgow Cross. His house had large grounds including orchards. The house was rebuilt around 1802 and renamed Gilmorehill House. It was demolished in 1870 to make way for the Gilbert Scott Building at Glasgow University. The university gym stands where the house stables stood.

In 1764 he became Dean of Guild for Glasgow Town Council. Connell was a magistrate in the city and had property both in Glasgow and the West Indies.

In 1772 he succeeded Colin Dunlop of Carmyle as Lord Provost.

Family
In 1747 he was married to Magdalen Wallace, daughter of Thomas Wallace of Cairnhill.

Their children included Sir John Connell, father to the chemist Arthur Connell.

Artistic recognition
His portrait by Robert Harvie is held at Glasgow Museum Resource Centre.
It was donated by Mrs Anne D. Houston of Johnstone Castle.

References

1717 births
1775 deaths
Lord Provosts of Glasgow
People from East Kilbride
Scottish merchants